Divorce Lawyer in Love is a 2015 South Korean television series starring Cho Yeo-jeong and Yeon Woo-jin. It aired on SBS from April 18 to June 14, 2015, on Saturdays and Sundays at 22:00 for 18 episodes.

Plot
Go Cheok-hee and So Jung-woo once worked together at a law firm; she was a well known divorce lawyer, and he was her office manager. She treated him like her inferior, while he constantly irked her by pointing out her mistakes and calling her "Chucky" behind her back. But Cheok-hee is so ambitious, so determined to win every case for her clients but her unethical misdeeds catch up to her which causing her license to be suspended.

Meanwhile, Jung-woo studies and gets his law degree thanks to his friend who happen to have a crush on him. Years later, they end up working together again for a different law firm. But this time, the tables have turned: he's the divorce lawyer, and she's the office manager. And Jung-woo relishes getting his petty revenge before ultimately realizing that she was the one who rescued him in a tragic accident in the subway when he was a law student on his way to the legal bar examinations.

Cast
Cho Yeo-jeong as Go Cheok-hee
Lee Bit-na as young Cheok-hee
Yeon Woo-jin as Seo Jung-woo
Shim Hyung-tak as Bong Min-gyu
Wang Ji-won as Jo Soo-ah
Lee Yul-eum as Woo Yoo-mi
Hwang Young-hee as Yoon Jung-sook
Lee Dong-hwi as Lee Kyung
Maeng Sang-hoon as Go Dong-sang
Park Joon-geum as Ma Dong-mi
Lee El as Han Mi-ri
Cha Yub as Jo Yoo-sang
Yang Ji-won as Yoo Hye-rin
Kim Yul as Go Mi-hee
Sung Byung-sook as Jang Mi-hwa
Kim Kap-soo as Bong In-jae
Shin Ha-yeon as Lee Ha-jung
Son Se-bin
Heo Jung-eun
Ha Ji-young as Kim-ji
Kim Young-hoon as Han Dae-man
Jeon Soo-kyeong as Lee Yeon-hee (cameo ep. 4)

Ratings
In the table below, the blue numbers represent the lowest ratings and the red numbers represent the highest ratings.

References

External links
 

Seoul Broadcasting System television dramas
2015 South Korean television series debuts
2015 South Korean television series endings
Korean-language television shows
South Korean romantic comedy television series
Television series by Samhwa Networks